Kevin Wilson Jr. is an American filmmaker, best known for his film, My Nephew Emmett for which he received critical acclaim and was winner at Student Academy Award, and received an Academy Award nomination for Academy Award for Best Live Action Short Film.

Filmography
Wilson directed, produced and wrote following films: 
 2022: Untold: The Rise & Fall of And1
 2018: Little Red Riding Hood (Short) (completed) 
 2017: My Nephew Emmett (Short) 
 2017: The Dreamer (Short) (assistant director) 
 2012: The Unattainable Piece (Short)

Awards and nominations
For My Nephew Emmett, Wilson received following accolades: 
 Nominated: Academy Award for Best Live Action Short Film 
 Winner: (Gold Plaque) Student Academy Award for Best Domestic Film School - Narrative 
 Winner: Woodstock Film Festival - Best Student Short 
 Winner: HollyShorts Film Festival - Best Director

References

External links
 

Living people
American producers
American directors
American screenwriters
Year of birth missing (living people)